Behan Bhai is a 1968 Pakistani drama film directed by Hassan Tariq who also wrote the screenplay.

The film stars an ensemble cast of Nadeem, Kamal, Rani, Deeba, Ejaz, Husna, Aliya Begum and Aslam Pervaiz. The music was composed by A. Hameed.

The film was screened at Lok Virsa Museum, Pakistan in March 2017.

Plot 
A woman, with her five children, heads towards the newly created Pakistan along with a refugee caravan. The caravan faces a deadly storm and all the children get separated from each other. Years pass away, the mother loses her mental balance due to the separation of her children. On the other hand, all of her children grow up and live their own lives separately except for the sister, who lives in village with one of her brothers who is unemployed. While others adapt different ways to make a living like pickpocketing, procuring and working as an office worker.

Cast 
 Nadeem
 Kamal
 Rani
 Deeba
 Ejaz
 Husna
 Aliya Begum
 Aslam Pervaiz
 Talat Siddiqui
 Ilyas Kashmiri

Music soundtrack
All film songs are written by Saifuddin Saif and Fayyaz Hashmi. Music is composed by A. Hameed.
 Ae Bekasson Kay Wali, De De Hamein Sahara Sung by Mala and Mehdi Hassan
 Hello Hello Mr. Abdul Ghani Sung by Ahmed Rushdi and Irene Perveen

Awards 
 1968 - Nigar Awards - Best Director - Hassan Tariq
 1968 - Nigar Awards - Special Award - Kamal

References

External links 
 

1968 films
1960s Urdu-language films
Pakistani black-and-white films
Films scored by A. Hameed
Nigar Award winners
Urdu-language Pakistani films